The Central Bank of the Russian Federation (CBR), doing business as the Bank of Russia, is the central bank of the Russian Federation. The bank was established on July 13, 1990. The predecessor of the bank can be traced back to the State Bank of the Russian Empire founded in 1860. 

The bank is headquartered on Neglinnaya Street in Moscow. Its functions are described in the Constitution of Russia (Article 75) and in federal law.

History

State Bank of the Russian Empire

The decision to create a State Bank of the Russian Empire was made by Emperor Peter III in May 1762, which was modeled on Bank of England and would have the right to issue bank notes. However, due to the coup on 28 June 1762 and the murder of the Czar, the project was not implemented. This ukaz also ratified the statutes of the bank. According to the statutes, it was a state-owned bank, intended for short-term credit of trade and industry.

In early 1917 the bank had eleven branches, 133 permanent and five temporary offices and 42 agencies. On 7 November 1917 the Russian State Bank was disestablished and replaced by The People's Bank which existed until the establishment of the Soviet Gosbank.

State Bank of the Soviet Union

The Central Bank of the Russian Federation
The Central Bank of the Russian Federation (Bank of Russia) was established 13 July 1990 as a result of the transformation of the Russian Republican Bank of the State Bank of the USSR. It was accountable to the Supreme Soviet of the RSFSR. On 2 December 1990, the Supreme Soviet of the RSFSR passed the Law on the Central Bank of the Russian Federation (Bank of Russia), according to which the Bank of Russia has become a legal entity, the main bank of the RSFSR and was accountable to the Supreme Soviet of the RSFSR. In June 1991, the charter was adopted by the Bank of Russia. On 20 December 1991 the State Bank of the USSR was abolished and all its assets, liabilities and property in the RSFSR were transferred to the Central Bank of the Russian Federation (Bank of Russia), which was then renamed to the Central Bank of the Russian Federation (Bank of Russia). Since 1992, the Bank of Russia began to buy and sell foreign currency on the foreign exchange market created by it, establish and publish the official exchange rates of foreign currencies against the ruble.

Role and duties
According to the constitution, it is an independent entity, with the primary responsibility of protecting the stability of the national currency, the ruble.

Before 1 September 2013, it was the main regulator of the Russian banking industry, responsible for banking licenses, rules of banking operations and accounting standards, serving as a lender of last resort for credit organizations. After pointed date functions and powers of CBR were significantly expanded and the central bank received the status of a mega-regulator of all financial markets of Russia.

It holds the exclusive right to issue ruble banknotes and coins through the Moscow and St. Petersburg mints, the
Goznak mint. The central bank issues commemorative coins made of precious and non-precious metals as well as investment ones made of precious metals, which are distributed inside and outside the country. In 2010, in honor of its 150th anniversary it issued a 5-kilo commemorative gold coin Alexander II.

Under Russian law, half of the bank's profit must be channeled into the government's federal budget. The Central Bank of Russia is a member of the BIS.

The Bank of Russia owns a 57.58% stake in Sberbank, the country's leading commercial bank.
The Bank of Russia owns as well 100% stake in Russian National Reinsurance Company (RNRC), biggest national reinsurance company.  RNRC was established in July 2016 for prevention possible problems with abroad reinsurance of large risks under International sanctions during the Ukrainian crisis, like constructing the Crimean Bridge.

Anti-fraud activities
A key prospective witness in improper financial affairs was Lyubov Tarasova who was a senior auditor for the Central Bank of Russia and worked for the "Unicom" auditing firm which had been established on 20 August 1991 and was responsible for "checking the correctness of the documentation and the essence of business transactions that are in doubt", but was stabbed to death in her apartment in Moscow on 15-16 October 1997.

In 2017, within the framework of a joint anti-phishing project of the Bank of Russia and search engine Yandex, a special check mark (a green circle with a tick and 'Реестр ЦБ РФ' (Bank of Russia Register) text box) appeared in the search results, informing the consumer that the website is really owned by a legally registered company licensed by the Bank of Russia.

Chairmen

Governors of the State Bank 
The governor was appointed by the emperor of Russia.

Chairman of the board of the USSR State Bank 
The chairman was appointed by the Premier of the Soviet Union.

President of the Central Bank of Russia 

The President of the Board of Directors of the Central Bank is the head of the central banking system of the Russian Federation. The Head is chosen by the President of Russia; and serves for four-year-terms after appointment. A Head may be appointed for several consecutive terms (Sergey Ignatyev was the Governor of the Central Bank for 11 years, and he was appointed three times, in the longest serving term in post-soviet Russia).

Subsidiaries
The Central Bank of Russia holds directly significant participatory interests in a number of Russian companies:
 Sberbank of Russia (50%+1 voting share of the stock);
Moscow Exchange (11.779% of the stock);
 Russian National Reinsurance Company (100% of the stock);
 Trust company of the Banking Sector Consolidation Fund (100% of the stock);
 Rosincas (Russian Association of Cash-in-transit).
Additionally, the Bank of Russia held earlier interests in some other Russian organizations. In particular, after the liquidation of Gosbank (State Bank of the USSR), the CBR beneficially acquired complete or controlling interests in five so-called "Russian Foreign Banks" (until 1991 – "Soviet Foreign Banks"): 
 VTB Bank (99.99% of the stock – until 2002, now - 60.9% owned by The Federal Agency for State Property Management (Rosimushchestvo) );
 Donau Bank AG, Vienna;
 East-West United Bank, Luxemburg;
 Eurobank, Paris;
 Moscow Narodny Bank, London;
 Ost-West Handelsbank, Frankfurt am Main.
All of them were members of the USSR Vneshekonombank system and were transferred to the CBR in 1992 by the Resolution of the Presidium of the Supreme Soviet of Russia. For over five years – 2000 to 2005 – all stocks of the Russian Foreign Banks were being purchased from the Bank of Russia by VTB Bank.
As part of the financial support to credit institutions, the Bank of Russia invests in them through the Banking Sector Consolidation Fund and acquires (on a temporary and indirect basis) shares in the equity of such banks. The first project of this kind was Otkritie FC Bank, in summer 2017.

Politics

In December 2014, amidst falling global oil prices, Western sanctions over the Ukraine crisis, capital flight, and fears of recession, the bank had increased the one-week minimum auction repo rate up by 6.5 points to 17 percent.
This caused a run on the ruble, and on 29 January, the bank decreased the rate by two points to 15 percent.

In January 2015, the head of monetary policy, Ksenia Yudayeva, a proponent of strict anti-inflation policy, was replaced by Dmitry Tulin, who is "seen as more acceptable to bankers, who have called for lower interest rates".

In response to the 2021-2022 Russo-Ukrainian crisis, multiple countries imposed economic sanctions against Russian banks. On 22 February 2022, US president Joe Biden announced restrictions of activities by US citizens involved with the Bank of Russia and others. In March, the Bank of International Settlements suspended the Bank of Russia.  In March 2022, the Depository Trust & Clearing Corporation blocked Russian securities from the Bank of Russia and Russia's finance ministry.
At the end of May 2022, three months into the invasion of Ukraine, the central bank cut interest rates in an effort to prop up the increasingly isolated Russian economy, suffering shortages and supply chain issues. The inflation rate rose to 17.8 percent in April. Also the ruble reached its strongest level against the U.S. dollar in four years, hurting exports.

Sanctions also included asset freezes on the Russian Central Bank, which holds $630 billion in foreign-exchange reserves, to prevent it from offsetting the impact of sanctions. On 5 May 2022, President of the European Council Charles Michel said: "I am absolutely convinced that this is extremely important not only to freeze assets but also to make possible to confiscate it, to make it available for the rebuilding" of Ukraine.

See also

 Bank for International Settlements
 Banking in Russia
 Consumer Leverage Ratio
 Core inflation
 Economy of Russia
 Farm Credit System
 Federal Reserve System
 Federal Reserve Statistical Release
 Free banking
 Gold standard
 Gosbank
 Government debt
 Goznak
 Independent Treasury
 International Reserves of the Russian Federation
 Andrey Kozlov
 National Foreign Exchange Association
 Payment system
 Real-time gross settlement
Russian National Card Payment System

Notes

References

Further reading

External links 

Bank of Russia 
  Creation of the State Bank of the Russian Empire
  State Bank of the Russian Empire at the site of the Central Bank of the Russian Federation
  State Bank of the Russian Empire at the site of the Central Bank of the Russian Federation

 
Economy of Russia
Banks established in 1860
1860 establishments in the Russian Empire
Government agencies of Russia
Russian entities subject to the U.S. Department of the Treasury sanctions